Nanuuseq, also known as Nanûseq or Nanusek is an uninhabited island in the Kujalleq municipality in southern Greenland.

Geography
Nanuuseq is a coastal island, although it is also considered a peninsula owing to it almost being attached to the mainland shore of King Frederick VI Coast. located off the southeastern coast of Greenland between the mouth of Lindenow Fjord on its southern side and the mouth of Nanuuseq Fjord —formerly known as Oyfjord— to the north.

Although Nanuuseq is relatively small, its highest point reaches  in height. The island's coast is deeply indented and the sound separating it from the peninsula on the mainland to the west is very narrow.

History
Peder Olsen Walløe reached this island in the 18th century while navigating along the then unmapped southeastern coast.

Until recent times the Southeast-Greenland Inuit visited the area around Nanusek during hunting trips up and down the coast. Fridtjof Nansen wrote about them towards the end of the 19th century:

Bibliography 
 Tr. as Eskimo Life, 1893.

See also
List of islands of Greenland

References

Uninhabited islands of Greenland
Kujalleq

ceb:Nanûseq (pulo)
sv:Nanûseq (ö)